Joseph Robinson (31 May 1927 – 3 July 2017) was an English actor and stuntman born in Newcastle upon Tyne, Northumberland. He was a champion professional wrestler, as were his father Joseph and his grandfather John. His brother, Doug Robinson, is also an actor and stuntman.

Career

Professional wrestling
Robinson initially embarked on a career in wrestling as 'Tiger Joe Robinson' and won the European Heavyweight Championship in 1952. At the same time, he was also interested in acting and studied at the Royal Academy of Dramatic Art. After injuring his back wrestling in Paris he decided to concentrate on acting.
Joe Robinson's daughter Polly Robinson (Hardy-Stewart) has also continued the family's success in martial arts by winning the junior Judo championships in the 1980s.

Acting
Robinson's first role came in the keep-fit documentary Fit as a Fiddle and in the same year, 1952, he followed it up with a part as Harry 'Muscles' Green in the musical Wish You Were Here in the West End of London.

He made his film debut in 1955's A Kid for Two Farthings, in which he wrestled Primo Carnera. His film and television career really took off in the 1960s and in 1962 he appeared in British classic The Loneliness of the Long Distance Runner alongside appearances in The Saint and The Avengers in 1963. With his younger brother Doug and Honor Blackman, he co-authored Honor Blackman's Book of Self-Defence in 1965 (Joe was also a judo champion and black belt at karate). The year after he appeared in an episode of the sitcom Pardon the Expression which referenced this book. During this time he was also a popular stunt-arranger, working on several James Bond films and in 1960 was invited to Rome where he appeared in five muscle-bound Italian epics, including Taur the Mighty (1963), Thor and the Amazon Women (1963) and Ursus and the Tartar Princess (1961). Other notable big-screen appearances include 1961's Carry On Regardless, of the British institution the Carry Ons. According to the book Tarzan of the Movies by Gabe Essoe, Robinson played the role of Tarzan in obscure Italian-made films (Taur, il re della forza bruta and Le gladiatrici); the use of the Tarzan character, however, was unauthorised and the character's name had to be changed to Thaur before the film was allowed for public release. His final big-screen appearance was in the 1971 James Bond film Diamonds Are Forever in which he plays diamond smuggler Peter Franks. Robinson claimed that he was a contender for the Red Grant role in From Russia with Love. Though he did not get it, Connery recommended him for the role in Diamonds are Forever. Robinson also claimed he turned down the role of the Rank Organisation's Gongman.

Retirement
Robinson retired from acting, and lived in Brighton, where he opened a martial arts centre, conducting classes in Wadō-ryū style karate and Judo. In March 1998 the 68-year-old Robinson hit the headlines after fighting off a gang of at least eight muggers single-handed when he was attacked after alighting from a bus in Cape Town; the gang struck with baseball bats and knives, but the 6 ft 2 inch-tall Robinson overpowered two with flying kicks, karate-chopped another, and broke the arm of a fourth with a punch- the rest fled. Robinson suffered "only minor cuts and grazes" and continued to enjoy his holiday.

Death
Robinson died at the age of 90 on 3 July 2017, in Brighton, East Sussex.

Filmography

References

External links
 Joe Robinson Official Website

1927 births
2017 deaths
Alumni of RADA
English male film actors
English male judoka
British male karateka
English male professional wrestlers
English stunt performers
Male actors from Newcastle upon Tyne
People associated with physical culture
Wadō-ryū practitioners